The 1964 Macdonald Brier, the Canadian men's national curling championship, was held from March 4 to 8, 1964 at the Charlottetown Forum in Charlottetown, Prince Edward Island. A total of 13,573 fans attended the event, which was the smallest attended Brier since 1952. As of 2023 this is the only time that PEI has hosted a Brier.

Team British Columbia, who was skipped by Lyall Dagg captured the Brier Tankard by finishing round robin play with a 9–1 record. This was the second time in which BC had won the Brier with their previous championship being in 1948.

Dagg and his rink would go onto represent Canada in the 1964 Scotch Cup, which they won.

Teams
The teams are listed as follows:

Round-robin standings

Round-robin results
All draw times are listed in Atlantic Time (UTC-04:00)

Draw 1
Monday, March 2 3:00 PM

Draw 2
Monday, March 2 8:00 PM

Draw 3
Tuesday, March 3 9:30 AM

Draw 4
Tuesday, March 3 3:00 PM

Draw 5
Wednesday, March 4 3:00 PM

Draw 6
Wednesday, March 4 8:00 PM

Draw 7
Thursday, March 5 9:30 AM

Draw 8
Thursday, March 5 3:00 PM

Draw 9
Thursday, March 5 8:00 PM

Draw 10
Friday, March 6 9:30 AM

Draw 11
Friday, March 6 3:00 PM

References

External links 
 Video: 

Macdonald Brier, 1964
The Brier
Macdonald Brier
Macdonald Brier
Curling competitions in Charlottetown